Santa Maria Maior is a freguesia (civil parish) and district of Lisbon, the capital of Portugal. Located in the historic center of Lisbon, Santa Maria Maior is to the west of São Vicente, east of Misericórdia, and south of Arroios and Santo António. It is home to numerous historic monuments, including Lisbon Cathedral, the Rossio, and the Praça do Comércio, as well as famous neighborhoods, such as the Lisbon Baixa, as well as parts of Bairro Alto and Alfama. The population in 2011 was 12,822,

History

The parish was created by the administrative reorganization of Lisbon on 8 December 2012, from the incorporation of other 12 old small parishes: Mártires, Sacramento, São Nicolau, Madalena, Santa Justa, Sé, Santiago, São Cristóvão e São Lourenço, Castelo, Socorro, São Miguel and Santo Estêvão.

The official name of the freguesia comes from Cathedral of Santa Maria Maior, seat of the Patriarchate of Lisbon.

The Baixa was built following the destruction of the 1755 Great Earthquake of Lisbon, under orders of King Joseph I of Portugal's prime minister, Sebastião José de Carvalho e Melo, 1st Marquis of Pombal, whose architects rebuilt the area in what is known as the Pombaline style.

Landmarks
Baixa neighborhood
Pillory of Lisbon
Lisbon Cathedral
Praça do Comércio
Praça da Figueira
Restauradores Square
Rossio
Queen Maria II National Theatre
Santa Justa Elevator
Lisbon City Hall
Alfama neighborhood
Casa dos Bicos
Santo António Church
Igreja de Santa Luzia
Largo das Portas do Sol
Castelo neighborhood
São Jorge Castle

References 

Parishes of Lisbon